Cesare Ciani (28 February 1854, in Florence – 13 February 1925, in Florence) was an Italian painter.

Life and work
He initially studied at the Technical Institute, then served in the Army for three years. It wasn't until 1878, at the age of twenty-four, that he entered the Accademia di Bellr Arti, where he studied painting with Giuseppe Ciaranfi and Giovanni Fattori. The latter was very influential in terms of Ciani's choice of subjects for his works; portraits and landscapes with figures.

In 1888, he presented his painting "The Widow" at the Circolo degli Artisti and, the following year, it received honorable mention at the Exposition Universelle in Paris. This was the beginning of his regular participation in art exhibitions and gallery shows.

By the turn of the century his works had taken on a more urban quality, reminiscent of Lovis Corinth, with a focus on workers. His landscapes also became brighter and his brushstrokes more fluid.

His paintings sold very well during his lifetime, but he has since been largely forgotten. Two years after his death, the art critic, Mario Tinti, and the painter, Llewelyn Lloyd, organized a major retrospective, with over 180 works.

Sources
 Jolanda Pelagatti, Renato Tassi, I Postmacchiaioli, Centro Editoriale Arte e Turismo, 1962, pp. 121-142
 Giampaolo Daddi, Una Raccolta privata di pittura toscana dell'Ottocento, Oggiorno 1984, pp. 49-50

External links 

 Biography from the Dizionario Biografico degli Italiani @ Treccani
 Biography @ the Società di Belle Arti
 More works by Ciani @ ArtNet

1854 births
1925 deaths
Italian painters
Italian portrait painters
Italian genre painters
Artists from Florence